Nazneen Ghaani is an Indian actress probably best known for playing the role of Ragini Juneja in Disney Channel India's sitcom, Kya Mast Hai Life.  Nazneen acted as Gauri in The Hangman.

Ghaani appeared in many advertisements like Big Bazar Badal Dalo, Cadbury Dairy Milk, Star Plus on Mobile etc. She has done over 150 advertisements.

Filmography 

 Maine Gandhi Ko Nahin Mara
 The Hangman (2005 film)

Television 

Kya Mast Hai Life as Ragini juneja

References

External links
 

1986 births
Actresses from Mumbai
Living people
Actresses in Hindi television
Indian television actresses
21st-century Indian actresses